Club Polideportivo Minusválidos Deportistas de Badajoz, more commonly known as Mideba Extremadura, is a wheelchair basketball team based in Badajoz, Extremadura, Spain.

History
Mideba was founded in 1982 as a way to motivate people with physical disabilities. The club made its debut in División de Honor in 1995 and played continuously since that year.

Few years later, Mideba started to play in European competitions, where it achieved the Willi Brinkmann Cup in 2000 and the Challenge Cup in 2013.

Season by season

References

External links
 Official website

Basketball teams in Extremadura
Wheelchair basketball teams in Spain
Sport in Badajoz